Whatì (from the Dogrib language meaning "Marten Lakes"), officially the Tłı̨chǫ Community Government of Whatì is a First Nations community in the North Slave Region of the Northwest Territories, Canada.

History
With rich and varied wildlife, the area has long been a favoured hunting ground of the Tłı̨chǫ (Dogrib Dene) Indigenous people. The North West Company established a trading post there in 1793, and many natives began settling there permanently, while they continued to hunt and fish in the area. With the establishment of a trading post at Fort Rae on Great Slave Lake in the late 19th century, most regional trading was accomplished at the Hudson's Bay Company and free traders posts there. A trading post at Lac La Martre was not again established until the 1920s.

On January 1, 1996, the community officially changed its name from Lac La Martre to the Tłı̨chǫ name "Wha Ti", meaning "Marten Lake," the same meaning as the French and then on August 4, 2005 to the current spelling. Other traditional Tłı̨chǫ names for the settlement include Tsoti ('fouled water lake') and Mine Go Kola ('net fishing with houses').

Before 2005, the community was unincorporated, and local governance was provided by a First Nations band government, Wha Ti First Nation. Under the terms of the Tłı̨chǫ Agreement, most responsibilities of Wha Ti have been transferred to a new Whatì Community Government. However, the First Nation is still recognized by the federal government for Indian Act enrollment.

Demographics

The majority of the population is Indigenous of which 445 were First Nations and 10 were Métis. The main languages were Dogrib and English with a few North Slavey speakers.

Economy
While trapping, hunting, and fishing continue to be the main economic activities in this traditional community, efforts have been made to develop tourism as well. A fishing lodge was opened, and many tourists come to see the abundant wildlife, including black bears, barren-ground caribou, wolves, and eagles. The community takes special pride in the fact that no alcohol is allowed there.

Whatì is part of the Tlicho Government.

Infrastructure

Transport
Previously, Whatì was accessible from the rest of Canada by the Whatì Airport and a winter road. Construction of the Tlicho All-Season Road, connecting the community to the Yellowknife Highway, began in 2019, and the road was opened in November 2021.

Communications
Telephone service was introduced to Whati in 1982.

Climate 
Whatì has a subarctic climate (Dfc) with mild to warm summers and long cold winters.

See also
 List of municipalities in the Northwest Territories
Whatì Airport
Whatì Water Aerodrome

References

External links

Official website

Communities in the North Slave Region
Tłı̨chǫ community governments in the Northwest Territories
North West Company
Dene communities
Road-inaccessible communities of the Northwest Territories